Oliviero Zega (January 4, 1924 – 2012) was an Italian professional football player.

He played one game in the 1947/48 Serie A season for A.S. Roma.

1924 births
2012 deaths
Italian footballers
Serie A players
A.S. Roma players
Association football midfielders